Cichlidogyrus makasai is a species of monopisthocotylean monogenean in the family Dactylogyridae. It was first found infecting the gills of Ophthalmotilapia ventralis in Lake Tanganyika. It can be differentiated from its cogenerates by the unusual length of its dorsal transverse bar auricles.

References

Further reading
Bukinga, Fidel Muterezi, et al. "Ancyrocephalidae (Monogenea) of Lake Tanganyika: III: Cichlidogyrus infecting the world’s biggest cichlid and the non-endemic tribes Haplochromini, Oreochromini and Tylochromini (Teleostei, Cichlidae)." Parasitology research 111.5 (2012): 2049–2061.
Pariselle, Antoine, et al. "Ancyrocephalidae (Monogenea) of Lake Tanganyika: IV: Cichlidogyrus parasitizing species of Bathybatini (Teleostei, Cichlidae): reduced host-specificity in the deepwater realm?." Hydrobiologia 748.1 (2015): 99-119.

Dactylogyridae
Animals described in 2011